LD 50 Lethal Dose is a 2003 horror film directed by Simon De Selva, produced by Alistair MacLean-Clark and Basil Stephens and written by Matthew McGuchan. A group of animal rights activists set off to free an imprisoned colleague from a terrifying ordeal but their rescue mission turns into a series of twisted and mind bending incidents. Starring Tom Hardy, Katharine Towne and Melanie Brown.

Plot
Animal activists Helen, Matt, Louise, and Gary break into an animal research facility, when Gary (McCall) gets caught in a bear trap. Unable to free Gary, the rest of the group flees, leaving Gary to take the blame. A year later, the group has since disbanded until an encrypted e-mail from Gary arrives asking for help. Danny (Bill), who has been visiting Gary in prison, tells the group that Gary has traded his body for experiments in exchange for a reduced sentence.

The group, still stricken by guilt one year later, eagerly reunites and investigates the research facility attempting to help find information on the request of Gary. When they arrive to the facility however, they find the place is a dump and abandoned. They continue to investigate anyhow, and soon realize that the facility has been the location of many recent illegal government experiments, not only on animals but on humans as well.

They then realize that they are locked in the facility and they battle explosions, chemicals, fires, floods, unknown creatures, and government agents. Helen attempts to recover more information, while Matt and Louise search for a way out. However, they split up, and Matt is captured by the government agents. Helen comes across a computer, and realizes that there are government agents who have gone rogue and are illegally attempting to create a super-human being. She is astonished at the discovery.

Meanwhile, Louise is attacked by a rabid animal, but is able to fight it off and electrocute it with wires that are dangling nearby. She then stumbles across a bubbling vat of acid. Realizing that the acid is being heated up, she figures that someone is there and begins to investigate carefully. She enters a storage room nearby and finds Matt inside, all bound and gagged. She realizes that someone is planning on throwing Matt into the acid and she promises to stop them, and to the dismay of Matt, leaves him tied up.

Meanwhile, Helen is confronted by "The Creator," the individual behind the program. Helen has already printed copies of the research and threatens to expose him and tells him he will go to jail. The Creator laughs it off and attacks Helen, trying to drown her in water. Helen smashes a vase over his head and knocks him backward. The Creator stumbles into chemicals and catches on fire. He tries to get into the water to put it out, but accidentally jumps into chemicals that accelerate the burning. He burns while Helen escapes.

Meanwhile, Louise is trying to save Matt. She hides behind some cargo after hearing two men approaching going toward the closet. They talk about throwing Matt into the acid and getting rid of him, so Louise ambushes them in surprise, throwing chemicals onto them she grabbed from a shelf. The men scream in agony and try to attack her, but they are startled and blinded. She ends up knocking both of them into the acid in self-defense. After that is done, she starts to retreat, apparently forgetting Matt is tied up. However, Matt realizes that Louise won the fight and hears her leaving, and, although gagged, he screams out hoping Louise will hear him. Louise does hear him and remembers, and she returns to the closet and she helps him and gets him untied and ungagged.

Helen, Louise, and Matt all meet up together. Realizing what each of them have gone through, the trio decide to call it a day. They exit the facility, having defeated The Creator and his henchmen, and plan to report it to the FBI. However, the area has flooded, and their van is beneath the water. They borrow a raft from the facility, load themselves into it, and head home.

Cast
Katharine Towne as Helen
Melanie Brown as Louise
Tom Hardy as Matt
Ross McCall as Gary
Toby Fisher as Justin
Leo Bill as Danny
Philip Winchester as Vaughn
Stephen Lord as Spook- "The Creator"

Production
Filmed on location in London, England and Isle of Man. Filming started on 27 October 2002 and went until 31 January 2003.

References

External links
 

2003 films
Films shot in London
2003 horror films
British horror films
2000s English-language films
2000s British films